The Western Conference is one of two conferences in USL Championship soccer.

Current standings

Members

Current

Conference Lineups

Clubs timeline

2015 (12 teams)
Arizona United SC
Austin Aztex
Colorado Springs Switchbacks
LA Galaxy II
Oklahoma City Energy
Orange County Blues
Portland Timbers 2
Real Monarchs SLC
Sacramento Republic
Seattle Sounders 2
Tulsa Roughnecks
Vancouver Whitecaps 2
Changes from 2014: USL Pro expanded and was rebranded as simply USL; the round robin table was split into two conferences: Eastern and Western.

2016 (15 teams)
Arizona United SC
Colorado Springs Switchbacks
LA Galaxy II
Oklahoma City Energy
Orange County Blues
Portland Timbers 2
Real Monarchs SLC
Rio Grande Valley FC Toros
Sacramento Republic
St. Louis FC
San Antonio FC
Seattle Sounders 2
Swope Park Rangers
Tulsa Roughnecks
Vancouver Whitecaps 2

Changes from 2015: Rio Grande Valley FC Toros, the Swope Park Rangers and San Antonio FC were added as expansion franchises; Saint Louis FC moved in from the Eastern Conference; the Austin Aztex went on hiatus

2017 (15 teams)
Colorado Springs Switchbacks
LA Galaxy II
Oklahoma City Energy
Orange County SC
Phoenix Rising FC
Portland Timbers 2
Real Monarchs SLC
Reno 1868 FC
Rio Grande Valley FC Toros
Sacramento Republic
San Antonio FC
Seattle Sounders 2
Swope Park Rangers
Tulsa Roughnecks
Vancouver Whitecaps 2

Changes from 2016: Arizona United SC was renamed Phoenix Rising FC; the Orange County Blues was renamed Orange County SC; the Austin Aztex folded; Reno 1868 FC was added as an expansion franchise; Saint Louis FC moved out to the Eastern Conference

2018 (17 teams)
Colorado Springs Switchbacks
Fresno FC
Las Vegas Lights FC
LA Galaxy II
Oklahoma City Energy
Orange County SC
Phoenix Rising FC
Portland Timbers 2
Real Monarchs SLC
Reno 1868 FC
Rio Grande Valley FC Toros
Sacramento Republic
Saint Louis FC
San Antonio FC
Seattle Sounders 2
Swope Park Rangers
Tulsa Roughnecks

Changes from 2017: Fresno FC and Las Vegas Lights FC were added as expansion franchises;  the Vancouver Whitecaps 2 folded; Saint Louis FC moved in from the Western Conference.

2019 (18 teams)
Austin Bold FC
Colorado Springs Switchbacks
El Paso Locomotive FC
Fresno FC
Las Vegas Lights FC
LA Galaxy II
New Mexico United
Oklahoma City Energy
Orange County SC
Phoenix Rising FC
Portland Timbers 2
Real Monarchs SLC
Reno 1868 FC
Rio Grande Valley FC Toros
Sacramento Republic
San Antonio FC
Tacoma Defiance
Tulsa Roughnecks

Changes from 2018: Austin Bold FC, El Paso Locomotive FC and the New Mexico United were added as expansion franchises.; Saint Louis FC and the Swope Park Rangers moved out to the Eastern Conference; Seattle Sounders FC 2 rebranded as Tacoma Defiance.

2020 (18 teams)

Group A (4 teams)
Portland Timbers 2
Reno 1868 FC
Sacramento Republic
Tacoma Defiance

Group B (5 teams)
Las Vegas Lights FC
LA Galaxy II
Orange County SC
Phoenix Rising FC
San Diego Loyal SC

Group C (4 teams)
Colorado Springs Switchbacks
El Paso Locomotive FC
New Mexico United
Real Monarchs SLC

Group D (5 teams)
Austin Bold FC
Oklahoma City Energy
Rio Grande Valley FC Toros
San Antonio FC
FC Tulsa

Changes from 2019: San Diego Loyal SC was added as an expansion franchise; the Tulsa Roughnecks were renamed FC Tulsa; Fresno FC was disbanded.  In response to the COVID-19 pandemic the conference was split into four groups.  Two groups of four and two groups of five.

2021 (15 teams)

Mountain Division
Austin Bold FC
Colorado Springs Switchbacks
El Paso Locomotive FC
New Mexico United
Real Monarchs SLC
Rio Grande Valley FC Toros
San Antonio FC

Pacific Division
Las Vegas Lights FC
LA Galaxy II
Oakland Roots SC
Orange County SC
Phoenix Rising FC
Sacramento Republic
San Diego Loyal SC
Tacoma Defiance

Changes from 2020: The conference was divided into two divisions, Mountain and Pacific; Oakland Roots SC joined in from NISA: the Portland Timbers 2 was withdrawn by the MLS parent club; Reno 1868 FC was disbanded; Oklahoma City Energy and FC Tulsa moved out to the Eastern Conference.

2022 (13 teams)
Colorado Springs Switchbacks
El Paso Locomotive FC
New Mexico United
Monterey Bay FC
Rio Grande Valley FC Toros
Las Vegas Lights FC
LA Galaxy II
Oakland Roots SC
Orange County SC
Phoenix Rising FC
Sacramento Republic FC
San Antonio FC
San Diego Loyal SC

Changes from 2021: The Mountain and Pacific divisions were dropped; Monterey Bay FC was added as an expansion franchise; the Real Monarchs and the Tacoma Defiance were withdrawn by their MLS parent clubs and moved to MLS Next Pro; Austin Bold FC went on hiatus; will move to a yet-to-be-named Texas city for the 2023 season.

2023 (12 teams)
Colorado Springs Switchbacks
El Paso Locomotive FC
New Mexico United
Monterey Bay FC
Rio Grande Valley FC Toros
Las Vegas Lights FC
Oakland Roots SC
Orange County SC
Phoenix Rising FC
Sacramento Republic FC
San Antonio FC
San Diego Loyal SC

Changes from 2022: The LA Galaxy II was withdrawn by their MLS parent club and moved to MLS Next Pro;

Western Conference Playoff champions by year

Western Conference regular season champions by year

See also
Eastern Conference (USL Championship)

References

USL Championship